Marpa may refer to:
 Marpa Lotsawa (1012–1097), Tibetan Buddhist teacher credited with the transmission of many Buddhist teachings to Tibet from India
 Marpa, Peru, ruins of a pre-Columbian town located along the Cotahuasi Canyon in the Andes range of southern Peru
 MARPA, Modification and Replacement Parts Association
 Mini-automatic radar plotting aid
 Earley parser, one variant of which is the Marpa parser